Rozzano Rufino Bunoan Biazon (born March 20, 1969), better known as Ruffy Biazon, is a Filipino politician currently serving as the Mayor of Muntinlupa since 2022. He previously served as Representative of Muntinlupa in the Philippine House of Representatives from 2001 to 2010 and from 2016 to 2022. He has also served as Commissioner of Bureau of Customs from 2011 to 2013. From 1991 to 1992, he also served as a board member of the Videogram Regulatory Board. He is the son of former senator Rodolfo Biazon.

In Congress, he served as chairman of the Committee on Metro Manila Development, vice chairman of the Committee on National Defense and Security, vice chairman of the Committee on Information and Communications Technology, vice chairman of the Committee on Appropriations and member of the Congressional Oversight Committee on Visiting Forces Agreement.

His three terms as legislator was marked by very significant achievements. He was principal author of 8 Republic Acts, which includes the National Disaster Risk Reduction and Management Act and the Philippine Coast Guard Act and co-author of 36 others. In his last term in Congress, he filed a total of 81 bills and resolutions, most of which are national in scope.

For his exemplary performance as House Representative, Commissioner Biazon was cited by the Philippine Daily Inquirer as “one of the most prolific legislators”. The Philippine Graphic Magazine also included him as one of the Top 100 Young Leaders of the country and the Philippines Free Press Magazine as an Outstanding Congressman.

Early life
Christened Rozzano Rufino Bunoan Biazon, his parents call him Ruffy. He was born on March 20, 1969, at a military hospital at the Cavite Naval Station in Cavite City, the third and youngest child of then Lt. Rodolfo Gaspar Biazon and Monserrat Biazon. Ruffy grew up in a military camp. He spent his childhood in Navy Village in Fort Bonifacio where they stayed in government housing for military officers.

For his basic education, Ruffy attended at Malate Catholic School. In school, he was consistently at the higher ranks of the class and was very active in extra curricular activities.

At a young age, he exhibited leadership qualities, always a class officer, many times class president. He also served in the student council during his entire stay in the school, becoming the president in his senior year.

A capable writer, he was also in the editorial staff of the school newspaper, from first year to fourth year ultimately becoming the editor in chief. Ruffy actively participated in essay writing contests and spelling bees, consistently winning first place in the competitions he joined. He also became the school's entry in the Science Quiz Bee, reaching the semi-finals.

The dream to become a doctor ushered Ruffy to take up Medical Technology at the University of Santo Tomas, although he was not able to move on to medical school nor practice his profession since he was diverted into an equally fulfilling but more exciting field—public service.

Ruffy's social involvement is not just limited to his official duties as a public official. He is also a member of several socio-civic organizations and clubs as a member of the Rotary Club of Alabang North and an honorary member of the Fraternal Order of the Philippine Eagles.

Political career

Videogram Regulatory Board
Ruffy began his public life right after college when he was appointed by then President Corazon Aquino as Youth Representative in the Videogram Regulatory Board. He was 22 years old.

Senate staff
When his father, a newly retired Armed Forces Chief of Staff, was elected Senator in 1992, Ruffy was taken in as Senator Rodolfo Biazon as his Chief of Staff.

In 1995, his father did not make it in his re-election bid due to election fraud called “Dagdag-Bawas”. However, Ruffy was acquired by newly elected Senator Sergio Osmeña III as Chief Legislative Officer. When his father once again ran in 1998 and won, Ruffy returned as Chief of Staff in his father's office.

Ruffy directed and managed his father's campaign three times and served in the Senate for a total of seven years. Relying on this exposure and experience, he decided to take the front line instead of just being in the background by running for a seat in the House of Representatives.

House of Representatives (2001–2010)

In 2001, Ruffy sought the seat of the Lone Congressional District of Muntinlupa, which was then held by Ignacio Bunye, a former three-term mayor of that city. Although bearing the name of his senator-father, he was considered an underdog, since then Congressman Bunye had a clean slate as a public official and an undefeated record as a politician. Ruffy was a newcomer and upstart in Muntinlupa politics, never holding any public office in the city.

Against all odds and managing his own campaign, Ruffy won in his first bid for public office, beating the incumbent by 1,500 votes which was not contested with an election protest. This victory was recognized in political circles as one of the most significant upsets in the 2001 elections. Ruffy acknowledged the hard work of his campaigners and their “intelligent campaign” in this victory.

But Ruffy emphasizes that all the work and thought put into the campaign would have been in vain if God's grace was not present. To him, the most important ingredient was the constant and profuse prayers which covered his electoral bid. He said, “In this victory, I have a lot of people to thank but I owe everything to God.”

The people of Muntinlupa were not mistaken in electing him. Adopting a program of government which he termed as “6K”, which meant “Karunungan, Kalusugan, Kaunlaran, Kapayapaan, Kabuhayan, Kalikasan”, he delivered services to his constituents and performed his duties as a legislator focused on his six stated agendas. Recognizing and appreciating his performance, the electorate of Muntinlupa elected him for a second term in 2004, and he won by a landslide victory.

While his re-election bid for a second term was easy, his third and final election as the Representative of the Lone District of Muntinlupa was to be more difficult than his first. For his third term, Ruffy was challenged by veteran broadcaster-journalist Ricardo “Dong” Puno. Not only was he a very well-known public figure, his brother also headed the Department of Interior and Local Government, which had control over barangays and the Philippine National Police.

In addition, Sec. Ronnie Puno also had the reputation of being a successful election specialist. In the face-off between Ruffy Biazon and Dong Puno in 2007, Dong Puno enjoyed the advantage of being the candidate of the incumbent mayor, gaining the endorsement of two major religious groups and the support of a very popular TV game show host.

In spite of being an incumbent, it was the perception of many that Ruffy was the underdog with all odds stacked against him. But the people of Muntinlupa elected Ruffy for a third term with a comfortable lead over his rival. Although his opponent cried foul, no election protest against Ruffy was filed due to his convincing victory.

Performance as a Legislator and District Representative 
Ruffy's performance as the Representative of the Lone District of Muntinlupa  was marked by very significant achievements. He proved his worth as a legislator, having authored 8 Republic Acts as a principal author and 36 others as co-author. In his last term, he filed a total of 81 bills and resolutions, most of which are national in scope.

The congressman is an active participant in committee hearings and plenary sessions in the House of Representatives. Aside from delivering speeches on significant national issues, he frequently engages other members of the House in debates and interpellation.

He successfully sponsored and defended the budgets of the Department of Defense in the last two years, the Department of Agrarian Reform and the Metro Manila Development Authority in the previous year, which were all highly controversial due to issues concerning the agencies and invited the interest of dozens of legislators. Congressman Biazon stood continuously for four hours on the plenary floor asking questions from fellow congressmen who took turns taking to task one of the departments. In his trademark cool and composed manner, Ruffy successfully defended the sponsored budgets, not once buckling under the pressure.

In his district, Ruffy embarked on an ambitious yet realistic program when he first assumed office in 2001—the modernization of Muntinlupa's public school system by introducing the Computer Training for Educators and Resources for Students Program (Compu.T.E.R.S. Program).

The program had 5 stages:

Stage 1	- Computer Literacy training for teachers in the public school system. Upon the initial implementation, 800 teachers were given computer literacy training in order to introduce them to Information Technology.

Stage 2 – Provision of computer hardware which the educators can use not only in their daily office functions but also in teaching. Schools were all provided with computers for the students’ use as well.

Stage 3 – Technology Intensified Instruction (T.I.I.) was introduced. Software and teaching programs were provided which enable teachers to teach Math, Science and English using software specifically programmed for such purpose. Muntinlupa was the first city in the country to be 100% T.I.I.-certified.

Stage 4 – Computer Laboratories were set up in the schools with the objective of providing hands-on experience to as many students as possible. Prior to this, the only experience that students had with computers were the use of card board mock-ups which only provided them an idea of how to use a keyboard.

Stage 5 – Connection to the World Wide Web. A five-year subscription to the internet was made available to all the high schools of Muntinlupa, enabling students to have access to massive resources in the World Wide Web, opening doors of new opportunities for learning.

Owing to the huge amount needed to complete the program, he funded it through his congressional fund on a multi-year basis which was already factored in when the project was formulated. A believer in private sector participation in government, Congressman Biazon also engaged Non-Government Organizations as partners in his projects.

One example is his partnership with Gearing up for Internet Literacy and Access for Students (GILAS), a project of top-notch private corporations such as Smart Communications, Globe Telecoms, PLDT, Ayala Corporation and many others. Not only did it provide a more cost-efficient way of doing projects, it also increased transparency in government programs.

Another major achievement of Congressman Biazon in his district is the smooth relocation of the thousands of informal settler-families who live along the Philippine National Railways tracks which traverses eight out of nine barangays in Muntinlupa.

Since the beginning of his term in 2001, Ruffy pushed for an “in-city” relocation program for the informal settlers, as opposed to the traditional practice of the government to relocate the Metro Manila informal settlers to the nearby provinces. He proposed that the families to be removed from the PNR right of way in Muntinlupa be relocated to a site within the city, particularly the Bilibid Prison reservation which was 415 hectares in land area. He pushed for the allocation of 50 hectares to be used as relocation site for the relocates.

But more difficult in getting government to set aside the property for relocation is the challenge to convince the informal settlers to accept the relocation program. This was not made easy due to the practice of traditional politicians to ride on the popular sentiment of informal settlers to be given the land where they are illegally settled on. Add to that the tactic of certain interest groups to agitate the masses to go against government programs.

Using a grassroots information campaign through community dialogue and consultation, Congressman Biazon embarked on what seemed at the start to be a daunting task, to convince the informal settlers to accept their relocation which will require them to pay the government a monthly amortization for their resettlement. But since he patiently undertook this mission over a span of several years, the relocation program is presently 50% underway, with zero incidence of violent demolition along the railways of Muntinlupa, unlike many other government relocation projects where the informal settlers often resorted to defending their homes with sticks and stones and requiring government to use force to evict them.

Congressman Biazon's effective performance in the delivery of projects and services in his district earned him the trust and confidence of the people of Muntinlupa who elected him into office three times. Focusing on the basic needs of his constituents such as health, education, livelihood and peace and order, Congressman Biazon effectively used the congressional funds allocated to his district. He was even lauded by the Department of Education as an Outstanding Congressman in the use of congressional funds for education projects.

Senate bid
Being term limited as congressman, Biazon ran for senator in 2010 under the Liberal Party ticket. His father was also term-limited as senator and had decided to run for congressman of Muntinlupa. However, he lost, placing 14th, while his father was successful, succeeding him.

Bureau of Customs
On September 14, 2011, Biazon was appointed by President Benigno S. Aquino III after then Customs Commissioner Angelito Alvarez formally resigned at the Bureau of Customs. Two days after he formally accepted the position and he assumed his position as Commissioner on September 16, 2011. On December 2, 2013, Biazon resigned from his position.

In the Bureau of Customs, he pursued reforms to not only to address the perennial problem of smuggling and corruption within the Bureau but also led the advocacy to make Philippine Customs compliant to international standards on Customs administration. He initiated programs to transform the BOC through a three-pronged program — Modernization of Tools and Equipment, Modernization of Policies and Development of Human Resources.

House of Representatives (2016–2022)
As his father decided not to seek reelection, he decided to run for a return to Congress in 2016. Allied with Mayor Jaime Fresnedi, he was successful that year, defeating Ronnie Ricketts. He was then reelected for a second consecutive term in 2019.

Mayor of Muntinlupa (2022–present)
Biazon ran for Mayor of Muntinlupa in 2022, with incumbent vice mayor Artemio Simundac as his running mate, switching places with incumbent mayor Jaime Fresnedi, who is term-limited. He ran under One Muntinlupa, a newly launched local party. He won the mayoralty race in a landslide victory.

Personal life
Ruffy married Catherine Mary "Trina" Reyes, the incumbent Muntinlupa Gender and Development (GAD) Office Head, in 1990 and were blessed with four sons.

In 1993, Ruffy joined the Victory Christian Fellowship and even served in their church as a Children's Church worker. He saw it as an opportunity to improve his skills as a father and strengthen his personal relationship not only with his sons but with God.

References

External links
 Ruffy Biazon's Congress Profile
 Ruffy Biazon's Personal Blog
 Usapang FB Website

|-

|-

|-

|-

1969 births
Living people
Laban ng Demokratikong Pilipino politicians
Liberal Party (Philippines) politicians
PDP–Laban politicians
Commissioners of the Bureau of Customs of the Philippines
Members of the House of Representatives of the Philippines from Muntinlupa
Mayors of Muntinlupa
Filipino Protestants
Filipino Christians
Filipino evangelicals
University of Santo Tomas alumni